Shaker Creek may refer to:

Shaker Creek (Kentucky)
Shaker Creek (Ohio)

See also
Shakers Creek, a stream in New York